Milanka Brooks (born 12 September 1983) is an English actress, known for her roles as Ionela for 2 seasons of Benidorm (2015–2016) and Elena Tulaska in "USS Callister" from Black Mirror (2017) and as Princess Svetlana in the Channel 4 British royal family parody The Windsors in 2020.

Education
Milanka Brooks was born in London, England, on 12 September 1983, to her mother Mileva Brooks, who was a model, and father Harry Brooks Jr., an actor/writer. Brooks graduated from The Drama Centre London, Class of 2008/2009.

Career
Brooks first appeared on screen in 2009 in two French films: Spy(ies) and King Guillaume. Her first appearance on British television was in 2011, and was in her role as Francesca in series 11 of the BBC TV sitcom My Family. In 2012, Brooks appeared as a model in episode 1 of Joanna Lumley's TV comedy series Little Crackers, and as Elena in the BBC comedy Boomers in 2014.

From 2015 to 2016, Brooks  in the seventh and eighth series of ITV's Benidorm, portraying Ionela the  fiancée of Geoff Maltby, who was played by Johnny Vegas. Brooks appeared as Svetlana in the Catherine Tate television film Do Not Disturb in 2016.

In 2017, Brooks portrayed a TV presenter in the SyndicateRoom funded film Gun Shy alongside Antonio Banderas. In December 2017 she appeared as the blue-skinned Elena Tulaska in "USS Callister", the first episode of series 4 of Black Mirror alongside Jesse Plemons. Milanka also appeared in the Disney feature film Patrick in 2018. In 2019, Brooks had a role in the ITV drama Cleaning Up, and starred as Stasia in episode 3 of Four Weddings and a Funeral alongside Andie MacDowell and Jamie Demetriou in 2019.

Brooks portrayed the role of Princess Svetlana in the series 3 episode 4 of the Channel 4 British royal family parody The Windsors in 2020.

Filmography

Film

Television

References

External links
 
 
Milanka Brooks twitter

1983 births
21st-century English actresses
Alumni of the Drama Centre London
Actresses from London
English film actresses
English television actresses
Living people